Our Cancer Year is a nonfiction graphic novel written by Harvey Pekar and Joyce Brabner and illustrated by Frank Stack.

Overview
Published in 1994 by Four Walls Eight Windows, Our Cancer Year (an offshoot of the cult favorite comic book series American Splendor) relates the story of Pekar's harrowing yet successful treatment struggle to overcome lymphoma, as well as serving as a social commentary on events of that year. Co-author Brabner described it as a "book about activism and cancer and being married and buying a house, about being sick at a time when we feel the whole world is sick." It was, says Brabner, written "together from our different points of view, in the different way we experienced Harvey's illness."

In a contemporaneous review, Publishers Weekly described the book this way:

Pekar and Brabner discussed their unusual domestic/creative partnership in an article in the Los Angeles Times:

Our Cancer Year won the 1995 Harvey Award for best original graphic novel.

The creation of Our Cancer Year and many elements of its story were incorporated into the 2003 film American Splendor, based on the life and career of Pekar and his relationship with Brabner.

Legacy 
In 2011, Purdue University's Cancer, Culture and Community program published Lafayette: Our Cancer Year, a 141-page book inspired by Our Cancer Year.
Edited by Rosanne Altstatt, the book featured true stories by "cancer patients, survivors, caregivers, friends and relatives" from the Lafayette-West Lafayette community. Brabner wrote the book's introduction.

References

External links 
 "Graphic novelist, illustrator to speak at Purdue Cancer Culture Community event," part of Purdue University's Oncological Science Center's Cancer Culture & Community Colloquium (October 18, 2010)
 Our Cancer Year review at Graphic Medicine

1994 graphic novels
Autobiographical graphic novels
Harvey Award winners for Best Graphic Album of Original Work
Literature about cancer
Diseases and disorders in comics